Larisa Neiland and Andrei Olhovskiy were the defending champions but lost in the first round to Natasha Zvereva and Rick Leach.

Zvereva and Leach won in the final 7–6(7–4), 6–7(3–7), 6–4 against Gigi Fernández and Cyril Suk.

Seeds
Champion seeds are indicated in bold text while text in italics indicates the round in which those seeds were eliminated.

Draw

Final

Top half

Bottom half

References
 1995 Australian Open – Doubles draws and results at the International Tennis Federation

Mixed Doubles
Australian Open (tennis) by year – Mixed doubles